AMA Manual of Style: A Guide for Authors and Editors is the style guide of the American Medical Association. It is written by the editors of JAMA (Journal of the American Medical Association) and the JAMA Network journals and is most recently published by Oxford University Press.
It specifies the writing, editing, and citation styles for use in the journals published by the American Medical Association. 

The manual was first published in 1962, and its current edition, the 11th, was released in 2020. It covers a range of topics for authors and editors in medicine and related health fields. The online edition also has regular updates (style points that have changed since the last edition or new guidance such as how to present new terms like COVID-19 and SARS-CoV-2 or address race and ethnicity in science publication), a blog (AMA Style Insider), quizzes, and an SI unit conversion calculator. A Twitter account is active at @AMAManual.

AMA style is widely used, either entirely or with modifications, by many other scientific journals (including medical, nursing, and other health care journals), in many textbooks, and in academia (for papers written in classes). Along with APA style and CSE style, it is one of the major style regimes for such work. Many publications have small local style guides that cascade over AMA, APA, or CSE style (for example, "follow AMA style unless otherwise specified herein" or "for issues not addressed herein, follow AMA style").

Content areas

 Types of Articles 
 Manuscript Preparation for Submission and Publication 
 References 
 Tables, Figures, and Multimedia
 Ethical and Legal Considerations  
 Editorial Assessment and Processing
 Grammar
 Punctuation
 Plurals
 Capitalization
 Correct and Preferred Usage
 Non-English words, Phrases, and Accent Marks
 Abbreviations
 Nomenclature
 Eponyms
 Greek Letters
 Units of Measure
 Numbers and Percentages
 Study Design and Statistics
 Mathematical Composition
 Editing, Proofreading, Tagging, and Display 
 Publishing Terms
 Resources

Traits of AMA style
In general, AMA style strives for clarity and simplicity, and trusts the target readership to have a certain amount of knowledge and education. For example, AMA style dispenses with periods in abbreviations, on the grounds that they are unnecessary for meanings or clarity in all but very few contexts. AMA style also requires expansion of most abbreviations at first use, for clarity's sake. The AMA Manual of Style sets standards for mechanical style, but does not insist on invariability for its own sake in contexts where a bit of limited variation is logical, especially in higher-level style.

References 

Medical publishing
Style guides for technical and scientific writing
Academic style guides
American Medical Association
1962 non-fiction books